Anthracothema was a genus of extinct artiodactyl ungulate mammals that lived in Myanmar during the late Eocene.

Taxonomy
Ducrocq (1999) and Tsubamoto et al. (2002) considered Anthracothema a synonym of Anthracotherium. However, Lihoreau et al. (2004) and Scherler et al. (2018) rejected the synonymy, with the latter recovering it as sister to Myaingtherium and Siamotherium.

References

Anthracotheres
Eocene even-toed ungulates
Eocene genus first appearances
Eocene mammals of Asia
Prehistoric even-toed ungulate genera